The Telangana

 Department of Agriculture has been created by the government of Telangana mainly to provide agricultural extension services to farmers and to transfer the latest technical knowledge to the farming community. Telangana's agriculture department separated from Andhra Pradesh as part of Andhra Pradesh bifurcation. It aims to promote agricultural trade and to boost agricultural production and productivity in Telangana.

History
The economy of Telangana is largely dependent on agriculture and most people have taken farming as a profession. The podu system is used in some areas.

References

External links 
 agri.tg.nic.in

State government departments of India
Economy of Telangana
2014 establishments in Telangana
Agriculture in Telangana
Government of Telangana
Government agencies established in 2014
Telangana